Taking Off is a 1971 American comedy film, directed by Miloš Forman. It tells a story of an average couple in the suburbs of New York City who, when their teenage daughter runs away from home, connect with other parents of vanished children and learn something of youth culture.

Plot
Larry Tyne and his wife Lynn return home one evening to find that their teenage daughter Jeannie is not there. (Viewers know she is attending an audition, clips from which, with future star performers like Carly Simon and Kathy Bates, recur throughout the film). The Tynes ring the Divitos, with whose daughter Jeannie is supposed to be, but the Divitos' daughter claims she doesn't know where Jeannie is. Enlisting their friends Tony and Margot, the two  men search the neighbourhood bars while the women stay by the phone and gossip about sex. When the men return home drunk, Jeannie reappears, only to vanish again. Next day, Larry goes into the city to search for her. In the street he meets Ann Lockston, a parent who's also searching for a missing daughter, and Ann tells Larry about a self-help group for parents in their predicament.

The police from upstate call the Tynes to say their daughter's been arrested 300 miles away, for stealing. The two rush to see her, only to find that it is the Divitos' girl in custody, having given the police a false name. On the trip back home, they stop off at a hotel, where Ike & Tina Turner are performing. A drunk Lynn is followed back to their room by an amorous stranger, unaware that Larry is already asleep in the bed. After the stranger disappears, Lynn tries out some of the tips Margot had confided to her earlier.

Later, back in the city, Larry and Lynn attend a formal dinner for the self-help group. Afterwards, marijuana joints are handed round, and a young man named Schiavelli instructs the parents on how to smoke them. Happily high, Larry and Lynn take Ann and her husband Ben back to their home for more drinks and a game of strip poker. As the group gets more inebriated, a naked Larry jumps on top of the table to sing "Libiamo ne' lieti calici". At this point, Jeannie reappears and the guests hastily leave.

When Jeannie admits to having been with a boy, Larry suggests she brings him home for dinner soon. When he appears, he proves to be an intelligent and wealthy musician. However, he declines to play for them, upon which Larry entertains the four with "Stranger in Paradise".

Cast

 Lynn Carlin as Lynn Tyne
 Buck Henry as Larry Tyne
 Georgia Engel as Margot
 Tony Harvey as Tony
 Audra Lindley as Ann Lockston
 Paul Benedict as Ben Lockston
 Vincent Schiavelli as Schiavelli
 David Gittler as Jamie
 Ike Turner as himself
 Tina Turner as herself
 Linnea Heacock as Jeannie Tyne
 Corinna Cristobal as Corinna DiVito
 Rae Allen as Mrs. DiVito
 Frank Berle as Committee Man
 Philip Bruns as Policeman (as Phillip Bruns)
 Gail Busman as Nancy Lockston
 Allen Garfield as Norman
 Carly Simon as Audition Singer
 Kathy Bates as Audition Singer (as Bobo Bates)
 Shellen Lubin as Audition Singer
 Shelley Ackerman as Audition Singer
 Lois Dengrove as Audition Singer
 Bonnie Marcus as Audition Singer
 Jessica Harper as Audition Singer

Awards
The film won the Grand Prix at the 1971 Cannes Film Festival.

Reception
Writing in The New York Times, Vincent Canby declared that "Taking Off is not a major movie experience, but it is — a good deal of the time — a charming one." Variety called it "a very compassionate, very amusing contemporary comedy." However, John Simon wrote- 'I declare Taking Off an antihuman film: mean, arrogant, and thoroughly destructive'.  It is noteworthy that John Simon's obituary in The New York Times called him a "caustic" critic who "saw little that he liked", and The Washington Post reported that a published collection of 245 film reviews he wrote contained only 15 positive ones.

Home media
Taking Off was released to Blu-ray Disc,  by British company Park Circus, on 7 November 2011 as a Region-2 widescreen Blu-ray Disc and by Gaumont (with Carlotta Films as home video distributor) on March 23, 2011 as a Region-0 widescreen Blu-ray Disc.

See also 
 Taking Off (soundtrack)

References

External links 
 
 
 

1970s musical comedy-drama films
1971 comedy-drama films
1971 films
American musical comedy-drama films
American films about cannabis
Films about runaways
Films directed by Miloš Forman
Films set in New York City
Films with screenplays by Jean-Claude Carrière
Films with screenplays by Miloš Forman
Universal Pictures films
Cannes Grand Prix winners
1970s English-language films
1970s American films